Stephanie Che Yuen Yuen (born 28 December 1974) is a Hong Kong actress and singer. Che started her career as the winner of New Talent Singing Awards in 1992.

Filmography

Film

Television series

Discography 
Love is Beautiful (TV series) theme-song – "The Price for Love" (真面目)

References

External links

 

Hong Kong singers
1974 births
Living people
New Talent Singing Awards contestants
Hong Kong film actresses
Hong Kong television actresses
20th-century Hong Kong actresses
21st-century Hong Kong actresses
American born Hong Kong artists